Jocelyn Towne is an American actress, producer and director.

Early life
Towne was born in Santa Monica, California, to an American father and French mother, the latter through whom she became a French citizen in 2013.

Career
Towne has appeared in a number of minor roles in film and television, including Havoc in 2005, Gilmore Girls in 2007 and The Selling in 2011.

Towne made her directorial debut in 2013 with I Am I, followed in 2014 by We'll Never Have Paris, co-directed with Simon Helberg.

Personal life
Towne's uncle is screenwriter Robert Towne. Towne married actor Simon Helberg on July 7, 2007. They have a daughter Adeline, and a son, Wilder Towne Helberg.

Filmography

Filmography

References

External links
 
 

Living people
American film actresses
21st-century American actresses
People from Santa Monica, California
Year of birth missing (living people)